The word Khufu can refer to:

Khufu (pharaoh), an Egyptian pharaoh
The Great Pyramid of Giza, sometimes called Khufu's Pyramid or the Pyramid of Khufu
Khufu The Mummy is a video board game, part of the Atmosfear series.
Khufu is a character in the Atmosfear series.
Khufu: The Secrets Behind the Building of the Great Pyramid, a 2006 book by Jean-Pierre Houdin
Khufu (cipher), a block cipher.
The Khufu branch of the Nile river, a former tributary, now dry